The 2012 Delaware State Hornets football team represented Delaware State University in the 2012 NCAA Division I FCS football season. They were led by second-year head coach Kermit Blount and played their home games at Alumni Stadium. They are a member of the Mid-Eastern Athletic Conference (MEAC). They finished the season 6–5, 5–3 in MEAC play to finish in a three way tie for third place.

Schedule

References

Delaware State
Delaware State Hornets football seasons
Delaware State Hornets football